Mela is a 1971 Indian Hindi-language family drama movie directed by Prakash Mehra. This was Prakash Mehra's second directorial venture after Haseena Maan Jayegi (1968).

The movie stars the real life brothers Sanjay Khan and Feroz Khan with Mumtaz as the female lead, Sachin and Rajindernath as the then customary comic relief.
The music was by R. D. Burman.

Cast 
 Sanjay Khan as Kanhaiya / Kishan Singh
 Mumtaz as Lajjoo Choudhry
 Feroz Khan as Shakti Singh
 Rajendra Nath as Bansilal
 Lalita Pawar as Kanhaiya's foster mom
 Dulari as Shakti's mom
 Raj Kishore as Palm Reader
Yunus Parvez as Bansilal's customer
Bhushan Tiwari as Sajjau
Sachin as Young Shakti Singh (as Master Sachin)
 (Randhir) as Shakti's/Kanhaiya"s Uncle
 (Nikita) as Billoo

Plot
In rural India a small village is ruled by a Panchayat, a group of men who run the lives of the villagers dictatorially. There are three men who challenge their authority, namely Bansilal,(Rajendranath) who is a low-caste Baniya but wants to marry Billoo (Nikita), who is a Brahman; Newcomer to the village, Kanhaiya/Kishan (Sanjay Khan) from the city comes to buy land for farming, He falls in love with Lajjo Choudhary (Mumtaz) after a few incidents, but he is refused permission to meet Lajjo by her father (Brahma Bharadwaj) and Mother (Mumtaz Begum) as no one is aware of his caste, and to make matters worse,he has been brought by a Muslim woman(Lalita Pawar) in the city where she finds him as a child; and finally there is Shakti Singh(Feroz Khan) - a dreaded bandit - who will not permit any daughter of the Panchs to get married as his sweetheart, Santho(Kanan Kaushal), was sexually assaulted and killed by Thakur(Ram Mohan). Shakti will not permit anyone to plow his land as he believes that his evil paternal uncle(Randhir) forged documents to make him the owner, and he blames himself for losing his brother, Kishan, during a Mela 20 years ago. Kanhaiya buys the land from his uncle in the city who dies soon after out of shock upon receiving such a large sum of money.,Now Kanhaiya comes with his foster mom to reside at the Uncle s home in the village. The Panch members and other Villagers now watch this move that will put Kanhaiya in direct conflict with Shakti - who has already killed five former owners who had dared to buy and plow this piece of land. Now Kanhaiya takes up the challenge to plow the purchased land in spite of being warned by Shakti's fellow bandit's.Shakti confronts Kanhaiya on the field but he is shot at and driven by the police patrol.Shakti return s back and burn's Kanhaiya s crops burns his house and carries away Lajjo from the village Kanhaiya follows the bandits in pursuit and enters Shakti's hideout to rescue Lajjo.

Soundtrack

External links
 

1971 films
1970s Hindi-language films
Films directed by Prakash Mehra
Films scored by R. D. Burman